The single-striped grass mouse or single-striped lemniscomys (Lemniscomys rosalia) is a species of rodent in the family Muridae.

It is found in Angola, Botswana, Kenya, Malawi, Mozambique, Namibia, South Africa, Eswatini, Tanzania, Zambia, and Zimbabwe.

Its natural habitats are moist savanna and arable land.

References

 

Rodents of Africa
Mammals of Angola
Mammals of Botswana
Mammals of Kenya
Mammals of Malawi
Mammals of Mozambique
Mammals of Namibia
Mammals of South Africa
Mammals of Eswatini
Mammals of Tanzania
Mammals of Zambia
Mammals of Zimbabwe
Mammals described in 1904
Taxa named by Oldfield Thomas
Taxonomy articles created by Polbot
Lemniscomys